Aart van Wilgenburg (16 September 1902 – 22 December 1955) was a Dutch swimmer. He competed in the men's 100 metre backstroke event at the 1924 Summer Olympics.

References

External links
 

1902 births
1955 deaths
Dutch male backstroke swimmers
Olympic swimmers of the Netherlands
Swimmers at the 1924 Summer Olympics
Swimmers from Amsterdam
20th-century Dutch people